Onkel Filser – Allerneueste Lausbubengeschichten is a 1966 West German comedy film directed by Werner Jacobs and starring Michl Lang, Hans Kraus and Fritz Tillmann. It was based on a novel by Ludwig Thoma and is the fifth in series of films.

Partial cast
 Michl Lang as Onkel Josef Filser 
 Hansi Kraus as Ludwig Thoma
 Fritz Tillmann as Bezirksamtmann Traugott Stiebner 
 Monika Dahlberg as Rosa Damböck 
 Hans Quest as Rittmeister Friedrich Wilhelm von Stülphagel 
 Elfie Pertramer as Cordula Damböck 
 Gustav Knuth as Gustav Schultheiss 
 Beppo Brem as Hauptwachtmeister Korbinian Damböck 
 Rudolf Rhomberg as Kaplan 'Kindlein' Falkenberg 
 Hans Terofal as Schreiber Klasel and Xaver 
 Käthe Braun as Therese Thoma 
 Karl Schönböck as Baron von Rupp 
 Michael Hinz as Max von Rupp 
 Evelyn Gressmann as Prinzessin Cecilie Amalie von Sachsen-Meiningen 
 Rudolf Schündler as Professor Liebrecht Mutius

See also
The Blue and White Lion (1952)

External links

1966 films
1966 comedy films
German comedy films
West German films
1960s German-language films
Films directed by Werner Jacobs
Films based on German novels
Films set in the 1880s
Films set in Bavaria
1960s German films